Fixstars Solutions, Inc. is a software and services company specializing in multi-core processors, particularly in Nvidia's GPU and CUDA environment, IBM Power7, and Cell.  They also specialize in solid-state drives and currently manufacture the world's largest SATA drives.

During the early part of 2010, Fixstars developed a strong relationship with Nvidia and focused its linux distribution for GPU computing. Yellow Dog Enterprise Linux for CUDA is the first enterprise Linux OS optimized for GPU computing. It offers end users, developers and integrators a faster, more reliable, and less complex GPU computing experience.

Terra Soft acquisition 
On November 11, 2008, Japanese company Fixstars announced that it had acquired essentially all of Terra Soft's assets. Terra Soft's former founder and CEO Kai Staats was appointed as COO of Fixstars's new American subsidiary, Fixstars Solutions, which is based in Irvine, California. Fixstars Solutions retained Terra Soft's product line, staff and regional offices in Loveland, Colorado.

Terra Soft provided software and services for the PowerPC/Power ISA and Linux OS platform. Former Terra Soft Solutions produced Yellow Dog Linux (YDL) and Yellow Dog Enterprise Linux which included cluster construction tools. Customers included Argonne, Sandia, Lawrence Livermore, and Los Alamos National Labs, several Department of Defense contractors including Boeing, Lockheed Martin, and SAIC; the U.S. Air Force, Navy, Army, and NASA; and many of the top universities around the world including California Institute of Technology, MIT, and Stanford University.

As an Apple value-added reseller and IBM Business Partner, Terra Soft Solutions provided turnkey and build-to-order desktop workstations, servers, and High Performance Computing clusters. Terra Soft made their Yellow Dog Linux distribution solely for PowerPC/Power ISA, optimizing the distributions for AltiVec and the Cell.

Terra Soft was the first to support a variety of Apple computers with Linux pre-installed (under a unique license with Apple). When Apple abandoned PowerPC CPUs in favor of the Intel Core chips, Terra Soft was able to concentrate on high-performance computing and the Cell Broadband Engine, working closely with IBM and Sony for the PlayStation 3 products.

In 2006, Terra Soft was contracted by Sony to provide a Linux operating system for the PlayStation 3, used by several University researchers as an inexpensive, powerful cluster compute node.

In 2009 Fixstars released CodecSys CE-10 H.264, an H.264 software encoder running on Playstations 3 from a USB key or live CD of Yellow Dog Linux, to provide faster than real-time H.264 video encoding using the PS3 Cell microprocessor.

Today, Fixstars of Tokyo, Japan carries forward the Yellow Dog Linux and Yellow Dog Enterprise Linux product line with primary focus on heterogeneous, multi-core CPUs such as the Cell Broadband Engine and Nvidia GPU.

Hardware

YDL PowerStation 
Terra Soft launched the YDL PowerStation also known as the Yellow Dog Linux (YDL) PowerStation on June 10, 2008 with a base price of $1,895.

The YDL PowerStation offers:
 Four IBM 970MP cores clocked at 2.5GHz
 8 DDR2 (PC2-5300P) slots for up to 32GB memory
 Can unofficially be expanded to 64GB of memory with 8GB DIMMs.
 Extended ATX motherboard
 Single IDE controller
 IDE DVD/CD-RW drive
 4 SAS hot-swap drive bays
 Two x8 PCIe slots, One x16 PCIe slot, One PCI-X slot
 ATI X1650 Pro with 2 DVI ports and 512MB of video memory
 2 Broadcom HT2000/BCM5780 Gigabit Ethernet ports
 4 USB v2.0 ports
 2 RS-232 serial ports
 YDL PowerStation comes pre-installed with Yellow Dog Linux v6.0
 No audio adapter is included

Fixstars GigaAccel 180 (IBM PXCAB) 
Fixstars GigaAccel 180 (IBM PXCAB) is an accelerator board based on IBM's PowerXCell 8i processor.
 4GB of DDR2 SDRAM
 Two 1 Gigabit Ethernet ports
 One x16 PCI Express interface
 Serial port

References

External links 
 Corporate website
 Terra Soft Launches Quad-Core 'YDL PowerStation'
 How do I download and install YDL®?
 Yellow Dog Linux FTP Mirror by KDD Labs in Japan

Companies based in Colorado
Computer companies of the United States
Free software companies
Linux companies
Cell BE architecture
Software companies based in California
Software companies of the United States